Dhigurah (Dhivehi: ދިގުރަށް) is one of the inhabited islands of Alif Dhaal Atoll where Whale sharks are year-round residents.

Geography

Demography

References

Islands of the Maldives